The Little Gem Nebula or NGC 6818 is a planetary nebula located  in the constellation of Sagittarius. It has magnitude 10 and oval diameter of 15 to 22 arcseconds with a 15th magnitude central star.

It was discovered by William Herschel in 1787.

NGC 6818 is located in the constellation of Sagittarius (The Archer), roughly 6000 light-years away from Earth. The glow of the cloud is just over half a light-year across.

When stars like the Sun are near end of life, they send their outer layers into space to create glowing clouds of gas, a planetary nebulae. This ejection of mass is uneven, and planetary nebulae can have complex shapes. NGC 6818 shows knotty filament-like structures and distinct layers of material, with a bright and enclosed central bubble surrounded by a larger, more diffuse cloud.

Scientists believe that the stellar wind from the central star propels the outflowing material, forming the elongated shape of NGC 6818. As this stellar wind moves through the slower-moving cloud it creates particularly bright spots in the bubble's outer layers.

Gallery

See also
 List of NGC objects
 Planetary nebula

References

 Robert Burnham, Jr, Burnham's Celestial Handbook: An observer's guide to the universe beyond the solar system, vol 3, p. 1558

External links

 Planetary Nebula NGC 6818
 Encyclopedia article

Planetary nebulae
6818
Sagittarius (constellation)
Astronomical objects discovered in 1787